Sir Matthew Clive Pinsent,  (born 10 October 1970) is an English rower and broadcaster. During his rowing career, he won 10 world championship gold medals and four consecutive Olympic gold medals.

Since retiring, he has worked as a sports broadcaster for the BBC.

Early life and family
Pinsent was born on 10 October 1970 in Holt, Norfolk, the son of Reverend Ewen Macpherson Pinsent (1930–2020), curate of St Andrew's parish church, Kelso, Scottish Borders, and Jean Grizel, daughter of Major-General Neil McMicking, CB, CBE, DSO, MC, of Eastferry, Dunkeld, Perthshire, head of the McMicking gentry family of Miltonise, Dumfries and Galloway.

His paternal grandfather, Royal Navy Commander Clive Pinsent (1886–1948), of Edinglassie Lodge, near Huntly, Aberdeenshire, was a younger son of Sir Richard Pinsent, 1st Baronet, President of the Law Society between 1918 and 1919. Pinsent is directly descended from Thomas Howard, 2nd Duke of Norfolk, and thus from King Edward I and William the Conqueror. Sir George Anson is also an ancestor, as was Richard Fitz Gilbert de Clare

Rowing

Student rower
Matthew Pinsent attended Aysgarth School in North Yorkshire before he began rowing at Eton College. He began his international career at the World Rowing Junior Championships in 1987. He raced again in 1988, winning the junior coxless pairs with Tim Foster.

After finishing school, Pinsent read geography at St Catherine's College, Oxford. While a student, he competed in three Boat Races, winning in 1990 and 1991 but was unsuccessful in 1993 (when he was Boat Club President), having taken a year out in 1992 in order to concentrate on preparing for the Barcelona Olympics.

International career
In 1990, while still at Oxford, he joined Steve Redgrave in the coxless pair at the World Rowing Championships, winning bronze. This was the beginning of a long partnership, and the pair won at the World Championships in 1991, and at the Olympic Games in 1992 and 1996.

In 2000 he won Olympic gold again as part of a coxless four with Redgrave, James Cracknell and Tim Foster. He also carried the flag for Team GB at the opening ceremony. In August 2000, the month prior to winning gold in Sydney, he took part in a three-part BBC documentary entitled Gold Fever. This followed the coxless four team in the years leading up to the Olympics, including video diaries recording the highs and lows in the quest for what would be Pinsent's third consecutive gold.

He was the subject of This Is Your Life in November 2000 when he was surprised by Michael Aspel during a party celebrating the achievements of the British Olympic Association at the London Aquarium.

Pinsent and Cracknell then formed a men's coxless pair and won the coxless and coxed pairs (with Neil Chugani coxing) in the 2001 World Championships, and the coxless pair in 2002. However, after a disappointing 2003 season that saw Pinsent's first World Championships defeat since 1990, he and Cracknell moved to the men's coxless four for 2004.

At the 2004 Summer Olympics in Athens, Pinsent's fourth Olympic Games, Pinsent stroked the boat, with Cracknell, Ed Coode and Steve Williams. In a close race with world champions Canada, they again won gold.

Pinsent was elected to the International Olympic Committee's Athletes' Commission in 2001, replacing Jan Železný. In 2004, at the Athens Olympics, Pinsent failed to secure re-election to the post, being replaced by Železný.

The ,  Pinsent had at one time the largest lung capacity recorded for a sportsman at 8.5 litres. This has since been surpassed by fellow rower Pete Reed who has been measured at 9.38 litres.

Achievements

Olympic Games
 2004 – Gold, Coxless Four (with James Cracknell, Steve Williams, Ed Coode)
 2000 – Gold, Coxless Four (with James Cracknell, Tim Foster, Steve Redgrave)
 1996 – Gold, Coxless Pair (with Steve Redgrave)
 1992 – Gold, Coxless Pair (with Steve Redgrave)

World Championships
 2003 – 4th, Coxless Pair (with James Cracknell)
 2002 – Gold, Coxless Pair (with James Cracknell)
 2001 – Gold, Coxless Pair (with James Cracknell)
 2001 – Gold, Coxed Pair (with James Cracknell, Neil Chugani)
 1999 – Gold, Coxless Four (with James Cracknell, Ed Coode, Steve Redgrave)
 1998 – Gold, Coxless Four (with James Cracknell, Tim Foster, Steve Redgrave)
 1997 – Gold, Coxless Four (with James Cracknell, Tim Foster, Steve Redgrave)
 1995 – Gold, Coxless Pair (with Steve Redgrave)
 1994 – Gold, Coxless Pair (with Steve Redgrave)
 1993 – Gold, Coxless Pair (with Steve Redgrave)
 1991 – Gold, Coxless Pair (with Steve Redgrave)
 1990 – Bronze, Coxless Pair (with Steve Redgrave)
 1989 – Bronze, Coxed Four (with Terry Dillon, Steve Turner, Gavin Stewart, Vaughan Thomas)

Junior World Championships
 1988 – Gold, Coxless Pair (with Tim Foster)
 1987 – 4th, Eight

Career after rowing
Pinsent announced his retirement from rowing on 30 November 2004, and was made a Knight Bachelor in the New Year's Honours list announced on 31 December 2004.

He had already been appointed a Member of the Order of the British Empire in 1993, raised to Commander in 2001. He was awarded the Thomas Keller Medal by the International Rowing Federation in 2005.

Since retiring from rowing, Pinsent has worked for the BBC as a sports bulletin presenter and reporter. His assignments have included interviewing Dwain Chambers for Inside Sport, where Chambers confessed to taking drugs, and visiting gymnastics training centre in China where he found evidence of children being beaten, leading to IOC President Jacques Rogge to order an inquiry.

Pinsent has maintained his ties to rowing as an umpire or commentator of key events on the rowing calendar such as the Olympics, Henley Royal Regatta and The Boat Races. He umpired his first "Blue Boat" race in 2013.

In June 2012, Pinsent rowed on the Gloriana as part of the royal pageant for the Diamond Jubilee of Elizabeth II. He appeared again on the Gloriana the following month, bearing the olympic torch as it crossed the river Thames.

Pinsent directed "Unbelievable – The Chad Le Clos Story", a documentary following Chad Le Clos and his family for 18 months in the run up to the 2016 Summer Olympics, which was first broadcast in July 2016.

In 2020 Pinsent appeared as a contestant on Series 15 of BBC Television's Celebrity Masterchef, finishing in joint-second place.

Personal life
Pinsent is married to Demetra Koutsoukos, a businesswoman, former partner at McKinsey & Co, and current CEO of the makeup brand Charlotte Tilbury Ltd. The couple met at Oxford, where Koutsoukos was a Rhodes Scholar from Harvard.

They have three children: twin boys, Jonah and Lucas (born 2006) and a daughter, Eve (born 2008).

Styles and honours
 Mr Matthew Pinsent (1970–1992)
 Mr Matthew Pinsent, MBE (1993–2000)
 Mr Matthew Pinsent, CBE (2001–2004)
 Sir Matthew Pinsent, CBE (2005—)

Bibliography

References

External links

 Official website
 

1970 births
Living people
People from Holt, Norfolk
English people of Scottish descent
English male rowers
Olympic rowers of Great Britain
Olympic gold medallists for Great Britain
Rowers at the 1992 Summer Olympics
Rowers at the 1996 Summer Olympics
Rowers at the 2000 Summer Olympics
Rowers at the 2004 Summer Olympics
International Olympic Committee members
People educated at Aysgarth School
People educated at Eton College
Alumni of St Catherine's College, Oxford
Oxford University Boat Club rowers
Knights Bachelor
People in sports awarded knighthoods
Commanders of the Order of the British Empire
English television presenters
BBC sports presenters and reporters
Stewards of Henley Royal Regatta
Members of Leander Club
Olympic medalists in rowing
English Olympic medallists
Sportspeople from Yorkshire
World Rowing Championships medalists for Great Britain
Medalists at the 2004 Summer Olympics
Medalists at the 2000 Summer Olympics
Medalists at the 1996 Summer Olympics
Medalists at the 1992 Summer Olympics
Thomas Keller Medal recipients